KTTG (96.3 FM, "ESPN Arkansas") is a radio station broadcasting a Sports radio format. Licensed to Mena, Arkansas, United States, the station serves the Hot Springs and Fort Smith.  The station is currently owned by Pearson Broadcasting of Mena and features programming from ESPN Radio.

Programming
KTTG airs local programming and national programming. Local programming includes "The Morning Rush" with Derek Ruscin, Tommy Craft, Tyler Wilson and Nick Mason. The Dan LeBatard Show, The Ryen Russcilo Show, Sports Talk with Bo Mattingly and The Paul Finebaum Show. KTTG carries Arkansas Razorbacks football, basketball, and baseball.

National programming, from ESPN Radio, includes Mike & Mike in the Morning, The Herd with Colin Cowherd, GameNight, The Paul Finebaum Show and SportsCenter All Night.

Previous logo

References

External links

TTG
ESPN Radio stations
Radio stations established in 1990